During the 2004–05 Austrian football season, Austria Wien competed in the Bundesliga.

Season summary
Austria Wien finished in third and reached the UEFA Cup quarter-finals. They also won the Austrian Cup.

First-team squad
Squad at end of season

Left club during season

Matches

Legend

Bundesliga

League table

Austrian Cup

UEFA Cup

Qualifying rounds

Second qualifying round

First round

Group stage

The group stage draw was held on 5 October 2004.

Knockout phase

Round of 32

Round of 16

Quarter-finals

References

Notes

FK Austria Wien seasons
FK Austria Wien